Ida is a feminine given name found in Europe and North America. It is popular in Scandinavian countries, where it is pronounced Ee-da.

The name has an ancient Germanic etymology, according to which it means ‘industrious’ or ‘prosperous’. It derives from the Germanic root id, meaning "labor, work" (also found in "Iði"). Alternatively, it may be related to the name of the Old Norse goddess Iðunn.

Ida also occurs as an anglicisation of the Irish feminine given name Íde.

Ida is a currently popular name in the Nordic countries and is among the top 20 names given to girls born in 2019 in Denmark. It was among the top 20 names for newborn girls in Norway in 2013 and among the top 50 names for newborn girls in Sweden in 2013. It was among the top 10 names for girls born to Swedish speaking families in Finland in 2013. Finnish variant Iida was among the top ten most popular names given to newborn girls in Finland in 2013.

Ida was at its height of popularity in the United States in the 1880s, when it ranked among the top ten names for girls. In an essay from Frank Leslie's Sunday Magazine written in 1887, Ida is a favored name meaning "God-like". It remained among the top 100 most popular names for girls there until 1930. It last ranked among the top 1,000 names for girls in the United States in 1986.

Notable people with the name include:

People
Ida Applebroog (born 1929), American painter
Ida A. T. Arms (1856–1931), American missionary-educator, temperance leader
Ida Baccini (1850–1911), Italian children's author
Ida Barney (1886–1982), American astronomer
Ida Botti Scifoni (1812–1844), Italian painter, sculptor and designer
Ida Carloni Talli (1860–1940), Italian actress
Ida Cook (1904–1986), British campaigner for Jewish refugees and romance novelist
Ida Corr (born 1977), Danish singer and songwriter
Ida, Countess of Boulogne (1160–1216), French noblewoman
Ida Di Benedetto (born 1945), Italian actress and film producer
Ida Dixon (1854-1916), American golf course architect
Ida Dwinger (born 1957), Danish actress
Ida Horton East (1842-1915), American philanthropist
Ida Ekeroth Clausson (born 1991), Swedish politician
Ida Engberg (born 1984), Swedish techno DJ
Ida Finney Mackrille (1867–1960), American suffragist and women's political leader in California
Ida M. Flynn (1942–2004), American computer scientist, textbook author, and professor
Ida Galli (born 1942), Italian actress
Ida Haendel (1928–2020), British violinist
Ida Henriette da Fonseca (1802–1858), Danish opera singer
Ida Jenshus (born 1987), Norwegian musician
Ida Kleijnen (1936–2019), Dutch chef
Ida Krehm (1912–1998), Canadian-American pianist
Ida Lewis (disambiguation), several people
Ida Ljungqvist (born 1981), Swedish model
Ida Loo-Talvari (1901–1997), Estonian opera singer
Ida Lupino (1918–1995), American actress and film director
Ida Malosi, lawyer and judge from New Zealand
Ida Marie Lipsius (1837–1927), German writer
Ida Madsen (born 1994), Danish singer
Ida Elizabeth Brandon Mathis (1857–1925), American businesswoman and farmers' advocate
Ida McCain (1884–after 1937), American architect
Ida Nettleship (1877–1907), English artist
Ida Göthilda Nilsson (1840–1920), Swedish sculptor
Ida Nilsson (born 1981), Swedish trailrunner and ski mountaineer
Ida Noddack (1896–1978), German scientist
Ida Nudel (1931–2021), Russian refusenik
Ida Odinga (born 1950), Kenyan businesswoman, activist and educator
Ida of Bernicia (died 559), King of Bernicia
Ida of Lorraine (1040–1113), French saint and noblewoman
Ida of Nivelles (1190–1231), beatified Belgian Cistercian nun and mystic
Ida Laura Pfeiffer (1797–1858), Austrian explorer and writer
Ida Pinto-Sezzi (1852–????), Italian painter
Ida Praetorius, Danish ballerina
Ida Quaiatti (1890–1962), Italian opera soprano
Ida Redig (born 1987), Swedish singer, actress, music producer and songwriter
Ida Rodríguez Prampolini (1925–2017), Mexican academic, art historian and cultural preservationist
Ida Rubinstein (1885–1960), Russian ballet dancer
Ida Mary Barry Ryan (1854-1917), American philanthropist
Ida Sammis (1865–1943), American suffragist and politician
Ida Saxton McKinley (1847–1907), American first lady and wife of President William McKinley
Ida Schreiter (1912–1948), German concentration camp warden executed for war crimes
Ida von Schulzenheim (1859–1940), Swedish painter
Ida Scudder (1870–1960), American missionary
Ida Štimac (born 2000), Croatian alpine skier
Ida Tarbell (1857–1944), American journalist
Ida Vihuri (1882–1929), Finnish politician
Ida B. Wells (1862–1931), American journalist and civil rights activist
Ida L. White (fl. 1862–1901), Irish poet, also published simply as "Ida"
Ida Wood (1838–1932), American recluse
Ida Wyman (1926–2019), American photographer
Iida Yrjö-Koskinen (1857—1937), Finnish politician

Fictional characters
Ida, in Jaishankar Prasad's poem Kamayani
Ida, protagonist in the Monument Valley video game
Princess Ida, eponymous heroine of Gilbert and Sullivan's comic opera
Ida Barlow, in the British television series Coronation Street
Ida Blankenship, in the American television series Mad Men
Ida Davis, Glenn Quagmire's transgender mom on the American animated comedy series Family Guy
Ida Lebenstein, protagonist in the 2013 Polish film Ida
Ida Morgenstern, mother of Rhoda Morgenstern from The Mary Tyler Moore Show and Rhoda
Ida Svensson, in Astrid Lindgren's children's book Emil i Lönneberga
Ida, Arlo's mother in The Good Dinosaur
Ida, in Ida: A Novel by Gertrude Stein

Other figures
Ida, daughter of Corybas and mother of Minos, in Greek mythology
Ida (goddess), a goddess in Hinduism

See also
Ida (disambiguation)

References

Danish feminine given names
English feminine given names
Estonian feminine given names
Feminine given names
Italian feminine given names